Vesyoly is a khutor in the urban okrug of Maykop, Russia. The population was 680 as of 2018. There are 9 streets.

Geography 
The khutor is located on the left bank of the Belaya River, 17 km northwest of Maykop (the district's administrative centre) by road. Khanskaya is the nearest rural locality.

References 

Rural localities in Maykop Federal City